H.241 is a Recommendation from the ITU Telecommunication Standardization Sector (ITU-T) that defines extended video procedures and control signals for H.300-series terminals, including H.323 and H.320.

This Recommendation defines the use of advanced video codecs, including H.264:
 Command and Indication
 Capability exchange signaling
 Transport 
 requires support of single NAL unit mode (packetization mode 0) of RFC 6184
 Reduced-Complexity Decoding Operation (RCDO) for H.264 baseline profile bit streams
 Negotiation of video submodes

External links
ITU-T H.241 Recommendation

ITU-T recommendations